Fairview is an unincorporated community in Rush and Fayette counties, in the U.S. state of Indiana.

History
Fairview was established as a town in about 1828. An old variant name of the community was called Grove.

The Rush County side of Fairview contained a post office from 1830 until 1835. The post office was removed to the Fayette County side in 1835, and was discontinued the following year, in 1836.

Geography

References

Unincorporated communities in Fayette County, Indiana
Unincorporated communities in Rush County, Indiana
Unincorporated communities in Indiana